Camaldolese Hermit Monastery in Kraków is a Camaldolese priory in Bielany in Kraków, Poland. The monastery is located on the  Silver Mount.  It consists of hermitages and the Assumption of Mary Church.

The Camaldolese monks were invited to settle in Bieleany by Grand Court Marshal Mikołaj Wolski in 1603. The monastery was built between 1609 and 1630. The construction of the building was supervised by Walenty von Säbisch but after the collapse of part of the monastery the supervision over the works was subsequently taken over by Italian architect Andrea Spezza. By 1630, the monastery was completed according to his plans. 

The richly-decorated interior of the church is the result of works by another prominent Italian architect of the period Giovanni Battista Falconi.
Inside the Royal Chapel there are paintings by Tommaso Dolabella the court painter of the Polish king Sigismund III Vasa. The central part of the presbytery features a painting by a Polish painter and graphic artist in the Romantic style Michał Stachowicz depicting the Assumption of Mary. 

Throughout its history the monastery was visited by such kings as John III Sobieski, Władysław IV Vasa, John II Casimir and Stanisław August Poniatowski. On 19 August 2002, the church was visited by Pope John Paul II during his pilgrimage to Poland.

Visiting 
The monastery is open daily for visiting by men only.  Entrance is allowed daily at 
8:00, 8:30, 9:00, 9:30, 10:00, 10:30, 11:00, 15:00, 15:30, 16:00, and 16:30.

Women are only allowed to visit the monastery on twelve days of the year:
 Easter Sunday
 Easter Monday 
 May 3 - Feast of the Blessed Virgin Mary, Queen of Poland 
 Pentecost Sunday 
 Pentecost Monday 
 Sunday after June 19
 2nd Sunday of July
 1st Sunday of August
 August 15 - Assumption of Mary 
 September 8 - Nativity of Mary
 December 25 - Christmas Day
On these days, the Holy Mass takes place at 11.30.  Masses are also offered: 
 December 24/25 (Christmas Eve): Midnight Mass
 Pentecost Sunday: 8.00, 9.30, 11.30, 16.00, 18.00
 Pentecost Monday: 9.30, 11.30, 16.00, 18.00

Address 
Camaldolese Priory (Klasztor OO. Kamedułów)
Al. Konarowa 1
30-248 Kraków
Poland

Camaldolese monasteries
Benedictine monasteries in Poland
Buildings and structures in Kraków